Humberto Mariles Cortés (June 13, 1913 – December 7, 1972) was a Mexican equestrian who competed at the 1948, 1952 and 1956 Olympics. He won both individual and team show jumping events in 1948, and placed sixth-ninth in 1956. In 1952 he finished 12th in the individual three-day eventing and won a bronze medal with the team.  

At the Pan American Games Mariles won a team gold medal in show jumping in 1955. In 1964 he shot a driver who forced his car off the road. He was sentenced to 25 years in prison, but was released by presidential pardon after five years. In 1972 he was arrested in Paris for drug smuggling, and died in prison before the trial.

References

External links

1913 births
1972 deaths
Olympic gold medalists for Mexico
Olympic bronze medalists for Mexico
Equestrians at the 1948 Summer Olympics
Equestrians at the 1952 Summer Olympics
Olympic equestrians of Mexico
Mexican male equestrians
Olympic medalists in equestrian
Sportspeople from Chihuahua (state)
People from Parral, Chihuahua
Prisoners and detainees of Mexico
Prisoners who died in French detention
Mexican people who died in prison custody
Medalists at the 1948 Summer Olympics
Pan American Games gold medalists for Mexico
Pan American Games medalists in equestrian
Equestrians at the 1955 Pan American Games
Medalists at the 1955 Pan American Games
Recipients of Mexican presidential pardons
20th-century Mexican criminals
Mexican people imprisoned abroad